Geraldine is a 1929 American romantic comedy film, directed by Melville Brown. It stars Marian Nixon, Eddie Quillan, and Albert Gran, and was released on January 20, 1929.

Cast list
 Marian Nixon as Geraldine
 Eddie Quillan as Eddie Able
 Albert Gran as Mr. Wygate
 Gaston Glass as Bell Cameron

Preservation
Prints of Geraldine are preserved in the French archive Centre national du cinéma et de l'image animée in Fort de Bois-d'Arcy and the Danish Film Institute.

References

External links 
 
 
 
 

American romantic comedy films
1929 romantic comedy films
Pathé Exchange films
Films directed by Melville W. Brown
American black-and-white films
1929 films
1920s American films
Silent romantic comedy films